The 2018 French F4 Championship was the eighth season to run under the guise of the French F4 Championship and the first season under the FIA Formula 4 regulations. The championship used Mygale M14-F4 chassis like in the F4 British Championship and Australian Formula 4 Championship. The engine was upgraded from 1.6 litre to 2.0 litre. The series began on 1 April at Nogaro and ended on 14 October at Le Castellet, after seven rounds and twenty one races.

Driver lineup

Race calendar
A seven round calendar was published in the FFSA Academy website, confirming the return of Dijon-Prenois and moving the Circuit de Barcelona-Catalunya round in Spain to Jerez.

Championship standings

Points system
Points were awarded as follows:

Drivers standings – FFSA Academy

Drivers standings – FIA Formula 4

Juniors' standings

Notes

References

External links
 The official website of the French F4 Championship 

F4 Championship
French
French F4